John Aird may refer to:

John Aird (Lord Provost) (1655–1730), Scottish merchant, Lord Provost of Glasgow
Sir John Aird, 1st Baronet (1833–1911), English engineering contractor associated with Aswan Dam, MP for North Paddington
Sir John Aird (banker) (1855–1938), Canadian banker
Sir John Aird, 2nd Baronet (1861–1934), of the Aird baronets
Sir John Renton Aird, 3rd Baronet (1898–1973), of the Aird baronets
John Black Aird (1923–1995), Canadian lawyer and politician
Jock Aird (John Aird, 1926–2021), Scottish footballer
Sir John Aird, 4th Baronet (born 1940), British baronet
John B. Aird (ship), a self-discharging lake freighter/bulk carrier